The Shyngyrlau or Utva is a river in West Kazakhstan Region, Kazakhstan, a tributary of the Ural.

References 

Rivers of Kazakhstan
Ural basin